Morlaye Soumah (born 4 November 1971) is a Guinean former professional footballer who played as a centre-back.

Soumah spent most of his playing career with SC Bastia in France's Ligue 1.

He was part of the Guinea national team at the 2004 African Nations Cup, which finished second in its group in the first round of competition, before losing in the quarter finals to Mali.

After he retired from playing, Soumah was an assistant manager for the Guinea national team on several occasions.

References

External links
 

1971 births
Living people
Guinean footballers
Association football central defenders
Guinea international footballers
1994 African Cup of Nations players
1998 African Cup of Nations players
2004 African Cup of Nations players
Ligue 1 players
SC Bastia players
Valenciennes FC players
Guinean expatriate footballers
Guinean expatriate sportspeople in France
Expatriate footballers in France